The Stanford Institute for Theoretical Physics (SITP) is a research institute within the Physics Department at Stanford University.  Led by 16 physics faculty members, the institute conducts research in High Energy and Condensed Matter theoretical physics.

Research 

Research within SITP includes a strong focus on fundamental questions about the new physics underlying the Standard Models of particle physics and cosmology, and on the nature and applications of our basic frameworks (quantum field theory and string theory) for attacking these questions.

Principal areas of research include:

 Biophysics 
 Condensed matter theory 
 Cosmology 
 Formal theory 
 Physics beyond the standard model 
 "Precision frontiers" 
 Quantum computing 
 Quantum gravity

Central questions include:

 What governs particle theory beyond the scale of electroweak symmetry breaking? 
 How do string theory and holography resolve the basic puzzles of general relativity, including the deep issues arising in black hole physics and the study of cosmological horizons?  
 Which class of models of inflationary cosmology captures the physics of the early universe, and what preceded inflation? 
 Can physicists develop new techniques in quantum field theory and string theory to shed light on mysterious phases arising in many contexts in condensed matter physics (notably, in the high temperature superconductors)?

Faculty 
Current faculty include:

 Savas Dimopoulos, theorist focusing on physics beyond the standard model; winner of Sakurai Prize
 Sebastian Doniach, condensed matter physicist
 Daniel Fisher, biophysicist
 Surya Ganguli, theoretical neuroscientist
 Peter Graham, winner of 2017 New Horizons Prize
Sean Hartnoll, AdS/CFT, winner of New Horizons Prize
Patrick Hayden, quantum information theorist
 Shamit Kachru, string theorist; Stanford Physics Department chair
 Renata Kallosh, noted string theorist
 Vedika Khemani, condensed matter theorist
 Steven Kivelson, condensed matter theorist
 Robert Laughlin, Nobel Laureate known for work on fractional quantum Hall effect
 Andrei Linde, cosmologist and winner of Breakthrough Prize in Fundamental Physics
Xiaoliang Qi, quantum gravity and quantum information
 Srinivas Raghu, condensed matter theorist
 Leonardo Senatore, cosmologist and winner of New Horizons prize in physics
 Stephen Shenker, string theorist
 Eva Silverstein, cosmologist, string theorist, and recipient of MacArthur "Genius grant" award
 Douglas Stanford, quantum gravity theorist
 Leonard Susskind, string theorist known for string landscape; popular science book author

References

External links
 Stanford Institute for Theoretical Physics
 Stanford Physics Department
SLAC Theory Group

Stanford University
Theoretical physics institutes